is a Japanese former professional footballer who played as a midfielder. He played for the Japan national team.

Club career
Myojin was born in Kobe on 24 January 1978. He joined J1 League club Kashiwa Reysol from youth team in 1996. He played many matches as defensive midfielder from first season. He became a regular player under manager Akira Nishino in 1998. In 1999, Reysol won the champions in J.League Cup and the 3rd place in J1 League. In 2000, Reysol won the 3rd place in J1 League for two years in a row and he was selected Best Eleven award. However the club results were sluggish from 2002 and was relegated to J2 League end of 2005 season.

In 2006, Myojin moved to Gamba Osaka which was managed by Akira Nishino. He played as regular player with many Japan national team player and Gamba won the many title, 2007 J.League Cup, 2008 and 2009 Emperor's Cup. In Asia, Gamba also won the champions in 2008 AFC Champions League and the 3rd place in 2008 Club World Cup. This is the golden era in the club history and he was one of the central player under manager Nishino. However manager Nishino left Gamba end of 2011 season and the club performance deteriorated soon. In 2012, Gamba finished at the 17th place of 18 clubs and was relegated to J2 League. Although his opportunity to play decreased from 2013, Gamba won the champions in 2013 J2 League and was returned to J1. In 2014, Gamba won all three major title in Japan, J1 League, J.League Cup and Emperor's Cup. He resigned end of 2015 season.

In 2016, Myojin moved to Nagoya Grampus. However he could not play many matches. Grampus also finished at the 16th place and was relegated to J2. In 2017, Myojin moved to J3 League club Nagano Parceiro; after three seasons, he opted to retire at the end of 2019.

International career
In June 1997, Myojin was selected Japan U20 national team for 1997 World Youth Championship. At this tournament, he played full time in all 5 matches as defensive midfielder. In September 2000, he was selected Japan U23 national team for 2000 Summer Olympics. At this tournament, he played full time in all four matches as defensive midfielder with Junichi Inamoto.

He was capped 26 times and scored 3 goals for the Japanese national team between 2000 and 2002. He played three games at the 2002 FIFA World Cup.

Career statistics

Club

International

Scores and results list Japan's goal tally first, score column indicates score after each Myojin goal.

Honors
Kashiwa Reysol
 J.League Cup – 1999

Gamba Osaka
AFC Champions League – 2008
Pan-Pacific Championship – 2008
J1 League - 2014
Emperor's Cup – 2008, 2009, 2014, 2015
J.League Cup – 2007
Japanese Super Cup – 2007, 2015

Japan
 AFC Asian Cup – 2000

Individual
 J.League Best Eleven – 2000

References

External links

Japan National Football Team Database

Profile at AC Nagano Parceiro

1978 births
Living people
Association football people from Hyōgo Prefecture
Japanese footballers
Japan youth international footballers
Japan international footballers
J1 League players
J2 League players
J3 League players
Kashiwa Reysol players
Gamba Osaka players
Nagoya Grampus players
AC Nagano Parceiro players
Olympic footballers of Japan
Footballers at the 2000 Summer Olympics
2000 AFC Asian Cup players
2001 FIFA Confederations Cup players
2002 FIFA World Cup players
2003 FIFA Confederations Cup players
AFC Asian Cup-winning players
Association football midfielders
Footballers at the 1998 Asian Games
Asian Games competitors for Japan